Tyap is a regionally important dialect cluster of Plateau languages in Nigeria's Middle Belt, named after its prestige dialect. It is also known by its Hausa exonym as Katab or Kataf. It is also known by the names of its dialectical varieties including Sholyio, Fantswam, Gworok, Takad, "Mabatado" (Tyap 'proper'), Tyeca̱rak and Tyuku (Tuku). According to Blench (2008), Jju—with more speakers—appears to be a form of Tyap (although its speakers are ethnically distinct).

Distribution
Native Tyap speakers are primarily found in the local government areas of Jema'a, Kaura and Zangon Kataf, although pockets of speakers are also found in Kachia and Kauru in southern Kaduna state, and Riyom (especially Takad speakers) in Plateau State of Nigeria. There are also large speaking communities in Kaduna South and Chikun Local Government Areas of the state. Skoggard (2014) presented the distribution of the Atyap (Katab) people in Nigeria to include: Niger, Nasarawa, Kaduna states and the FCT.

Classification and dialects
Meek (1931:2) suggested that the Katab (Atyap), Morwa (Asholyio), Ataka (Atakad) and Kagoro (Agworok) speak a common tongue and may be regarded as one; and later on, McKinney (1983:290) commented that the Kaje (Bajju) should likewise be included with the above, due to the linguistic and cultural similarities shared by them. Murdock (1959) classified Kagoro (Gworok) and other dialects comprising the current Tyap language group as "Plateau Nigerian", in his "Semi-Bantu" branch of "Bantoid subfamily" of "Negritic Stock". Tyap and Jju were placed by Greenberg (1963) under the "Plateau II" branch of the Benue-Congo language family. Later on, Gerhardt (1974) made a reconstruction of the branch, assigning it as "proto-Plateau". Again in 1989, Gerhardt placed Tyap and Jju under the South-Central subgroup, Central group, Plateau branch of Platoid, a division of the Benue-Congo languages. Achi (2005) stated that the Atyap speak a language in the Kwa group of the Benue-Congo language family. However, according to Bitiyong, Y. I., in Achi et al. (2019:44), the Kataf Group (an old classification) to which Tyap language belongs, is a member of the eastern Plateau. He went further to suggest that by utilizing a glotochronological time scale established for Yoruba and Edo languages and their neighbours,  the separation of the Kataf Group into distinguishable dialects and dialect clusters would require thousands of years. Also mentioned was that,

noting further that this indicates that

He thereafter summarized that the implication for Tyap is that it has taken thousands of years to separate, in the same general geographical location from its about six most closely related dialects and stated that as a sub-unit, they required probably more thousands of years earlier to separate from other members of the "Kataf group" like Gyong, Hyam, Duya and Ashe (Koro) who are little intelligible to them. The stability of language and other culture traits in this region of Nigeria has been recognized.

Dialects
Tyap has a number of dialects, including:

Phonology 
The Tyap alphabet (Zwunzwuo A̱lyem Tyap ji) had 39 letters, as drafted by the Tyap Literacy Committee (TLC) during the early 1990s:

However, a current development as of 2018, has the Tyap Basic Alphabetical Chart reduced to 24, as follows:

The letter "ch" would henceforth be represented by the symbol "c", without the "h". All others remain the same.

Vowels 

The seven vowels of Tyap may either be short or long monophthongs sounds. The language has five (or six) diphthongs: .

Consonants 
The language has over 80 monographic and digraph labialized and palatalized consonant sounds, classified into fortis and lenis modifications. The following table contains the main basic consonant sounds of Tyap:

Syntax
Tyap has the SVO constituent order type as illustrated below in the first given example:

Words associated with the alphabet

Common phrases and sentences

Comparison of dialects 
Comparing the cognate percentages between Kaje (Jju), Katab ("Mabatado" Tyap) and Kagoro (Gworok) on the Swadesh wordlist consisting of 118 items of core basic vocabulary, Wurm (1971), in his remark stated that, the cognate percentages indicate that the three ethnic groups speak dialects of the same language.
Percentages of cognates on the Swadesh wordlist: Wurm (1971).
With a further comparison of their kinship terminologies, McKinney (1983:291), after comparing 174 entries between the above three found only eight to be non-cognate.
Percentages of kingship cognate terms: McKinney (1983:291).

 Below are comparisons made by Akau (2020) between the seven Tyap core dialects and Jju.

Numbers
 0: //
 1:  (also )
 2:  (also )
 3:  (also )
 4:  (also )
 5:  (also )
 6: 
 7: 
 8:  (or )
 9:

10 to 100

(15).

 10: 
 11: 
 12: 
 13: 
 14: 
 15: 
 16: 
 17: 
 18: 
 19: 

The numbers 20, 30, 40, 50, 60, 70, 80, and 90 are formed by replacing the prefix 2 to 5, affixed to the "" (ten) with n-, with the  itself taking the prefix n- throughout:
 20: 
 30: 
 40: 
 50: 
 60: 
 70: 
 80:  (or )
 90: 

Other numbers are formed by adding 1–9, similar to the teens:
 91: 
 92: 
 93: 
 94: 
 95: 
 96: 
 97: 
 98: 
 99:

Hundreds
Note that what could be termed as the "ancient" counting system used for 1-5 is usually used from 100 until infinity. 1 becomes jhyiung, and no more a̱nyiung. Same thing the 2,3,4 and 5 placed immediately after cyi, the word for hundred.

 100: Cyi jhyiung
 200: Cyi sweang
 300: Cyi tsat
 400: Cyi nyaai
 500: Cyi tswuon
 600: Cyi a̱taa
 700: Cyi a̱natat
 800: Cyi a̱ni̱nai (or a̱ri̱nai)
 900: Cyi a̱kubunyiung
 479: Cyi nyaai ma̱ng nswak a̱natat ma̱ng a̱kubunyiung

Thousands

Hayab (2016:66-67) in his research on Hyam, a related language to Tyap found out that the original word for number 10 is "kop"/kwop, and that the present word used for ten was the de facto word used for twelve or a dozen is "shwak" (in Hyam) or swak (in Tyap). Due to the growing Hausa/English influence, undoubtedly before 1920 (because Thomas (1920:59) cited an example with Kagoro (Gworok) which, unlike its neighbours the Nungu, Ninzam, S. Mada and Mama, was not using as at then, the duodecimal system), the counting system has taken the shape of the Hausa/English decimal style and the word "kop/kwop" became almost extinct, while the "swak" took its place and misplaced its original meaning, which is twelve, to now mean ten. With this in mind, when one considers the number "1,000" or cyi kwop jhyiung ("cyi kwop" is spelled one word), one can say that it literally means "hundred ten one" or "100 X 10 X 1".

Below are the modern Tyap Counting style in thousands:

 1,000: Cyikwop jhyiung
 2,000: Cyikwop sweang
 3,000: Cyikwop tsat
 4,000: Cyikwop nyaai
 5,000: Cyikwop tswuon
 6,000: Cyikwop a̱taa
 7,000: Cyikwop a̱natat
 8,000: Cyikwop a̱ni̱nai
 9,000: Cyikwop a̱kubunyiung
 2,018: Cyikwop sweang ma̱ng nswak ma̱ng a̱ni̱nai
 10,000: Cyikwop swak
 100,000: Cyikwop cyi jhyiung

Larger numbers
 1,000,000: Milyon or cyikwop cyikwop jhyiung or simply Cyikwop a̱ka̱feang jhyiung
 1,000,000,000: Bilyon or Cyikwop cyikwop cyikwop or simply Cyikwop a̱ka̱tat jhyiung
 1,000,000,000,000: Trilyon or cyikwop cyikwop cyikwop cyikwop or simply Cyikwop a̱ka̱naai jhyiung.

Names for other languages
Some Tyap names for neighbouring and other languaɡes are as follows:

.<ref name=Unpub>Akau, K. (2020). [Untitled work]. Unpublished raw data.</ref>

Related languages
A research list called the "Swadesh 100-word List" presented by Shimizu (1975:414) shows that Tyap (Katab) shares the following cognate percentages with fellow Plateau languages and Jukun beginning from the highest to the lowest: 72% with Izere (Izarek), 66% with Rigwe, 50% with Chara, 49% with Berom, 42% with Tarok, 41% with Pyem, 41% with Ninzam, 39% with Kuche, 39% with Eggon, 38% with Ibunu, 37% with Rindre and 34% with Jukun.

Endangered status
Research has shown that the Tyap language is classified as one of the endangered languages vulnerable towards extinction.

A study by Ayuba (2014) showed that Tyap is endangered and that Hausa language and the non-transmission of Tyap by the older generation of Atyap to the younger generation largely accounted for the endangerment of Tyap. 

The study recommended, among other measures, that the Atyap Community Development Association (ACDA) should set up a committee to create awareness on the need for Atyap to rise up and save their language and another to work towards establishing vacation schools where older adults would provide pre-school child care where Tyap children could be immersed in the language.

References

Further reading
Books and manuscripts

 
 
 
 Blench, R. (2008). Prospecting proto-Plateau''. (manuscript)

External links

 Sholio (Tyap) ComparaLex
 The Book of Luke in Takad
 Wordlist Tyap (Gworok)
 4laws (in Tyap)
 Tyap: Katab language (Global Recordings Network)
 Programs in Tyap (Global Recordings Network)
 World Atlas of Language Structure Online (Gworok)

Central Plateau languages
Languages of Nigeria
Endangered languages